Hecker may refer to:

 Hecker (surname)
 Hecker, Illinois
 Hecker uprising
 Hecker (motorcycle), motorcycle window
 Hecker Payss

See also
 Hacker (disambiguation)
 Heckert, a surname